London Seminary (formerly London Theological Seminary) is an evangelical vocational training college located in Finchley, London, England.

Overview
London Theological Seminary was founded in 1977 by a group of ministers led by Martyn Lloyd-Jones, who was chairman of the Board of Trustees until his death in 1981.  It trains preachers and pastors for the Christian ministry.  Its theological position is Conservative Evangelical in the Reformed tradition, and only admits men on the seminary pastoral training course. However, the seminary also runs a separate women's course called Flourish on nine days throughout the academic year.  Students are drawn from both the UK and overseas and from various denominational backgrounds.  London Seminary used to be licensed by the Home Office to enrol international students and in past years students have come from Argentina, Armenia, Brazil, Burma, Cameroon, Canada, China, Ethiopia, France, Germany, Honduras, India, Italy, Korea, Madagascar, Malaysia, Nepal, Netherlands, Nigeria, Pakistan, Peru, Philippines, Poland, Portugal, Russia, South Africa, Spain, Sri Lanka, Switzerland, and the USA. However, this is now no longer the case

Its name was shortened to London Seminary in September 2016.

Pastors' Academy
The Pastors' Academy (formerly The John Owen Centre for theological study) is an associated organisation situated at London Seminary. Puritan Reformed Theological Seminary, USA provides its London-based Master of Theology degree course through the Pastors' Academy.

The Pastors' Academy also provides advanced classes in Hebrew and Greek, Pastoral support, study projects and breaks, and conferences and study days on theological, Biblical, and ethical topics.

Faculty
 Rev. Dr. Bill James (Principal)
 Rev. Dr. David Green (Vice-Principal)
 Stéphane Simonnin (Greek and Church History)
 Dr. Garry Williams (Director of the Pastor's Academy)
 Phil Arthur 
 Rev. Dr. Robert Strivens
 Dr. Kenneth Brownell
Chris Davis (Greek Tutor)
Dr. Neil Martin (Tutor of Biblical Studies, Pastors' Academy)
Dr. John Benton (Director of Pastoral Support, Pastors Academy)
Matthew Mason (Tutor in Christian Ethics, Pastors' Academy)
Paul Yeulett 
Dr. Martin Salter

References

External links
London Seminary

Bible colleges, seminaries and theological colleges in England
Evangelical seminaries and theological colleges in the United Kingdom
Educational institutions established in 1977
1977 establishments in England
Education in the London Borough of Barnet
Professional education in London
Evangelicalism in the United Kingdom